Bird with a Broken Wing may refer to:

 "Bird with a Broken Wing", a 2015 song by Owl City from Mobile Orchestra
 "Bird with a Broken Wing", a 2021 song by Weezer from OK Human